Oreland station is a railroad station along the SEPTA Lansdale/Doylestown Line near Philadelphia, Pennsylvania, USA. The station, located at the intersection of Bridge Street and Bruce Road, includes a 99-space parking lot. In FY 2013, Oreland station had a weekday average of 276 boardings and 256 alightings.
The current station was built by the Reading Railroad (RDG) in 1931, as a replacement for a station built in 1890.

The RDG's former Plymouth Branch to Conshohocken begins behind the station via a wye track. Aside from a few hundred feet of track, the line to Conshohocken was abandoned by the RDG and Conrail in segments from the 1970s through the 1990s. The existing trackage was previously served by the Tank Car Corporation of America to store and rehabilitate railroad tank cars at their Oreland Mill Road property. Tank cars were buried underground to hold chemical waste from the fabrication, cleaning and painting of the working cars. The former site is currently undergoing a cleanup process being monitored by the U.S. Environmental Protection Agency (EPA).

Station layout
Oreland has two low-level side platforms.

References

External links
SEPTA - Oreland Station
 Station from Bridge Street from Google Maps Street View

SEPTA Regional Rail stations
Former Reading Company stations
Railway stations in the United States opened in 1890
Railway stations in Montgomery County, Pennsylvania
Stations on the SEPTA Main Line
1890 establishments in Pennsylvania